Sono Cairo (Sout Alqahira, Sout Al Qahira, or Sawt al-Qahira: , "the sound of Cairo") is an Egyptian government owned multimedia company.

Company history
Launched as a privately-owned record company, it was taken over by the government in 1964, and became the country's largest producer of discs.  it is under the control of the Ministry of Information.

Artist Mohamed Fawzi & Co was established alshark alawsat factory for CD's on 30 April 1959 and turned into sout Alqahira Company for CD's on 6 January 1964. Then issued its decision, Mr. / Minister of Information No. 139 of 1977 established a sout alqahira company for Audio and Video as an Egyptian joint stock companies as one of the Radio and Television Union of the Ministry of Information.

In Egyptian Revolution of 1952, President Anwar Sadat made a speech from the company's broadcast.

Former Chairmen

Video production
Sono Cairo's production includes production of religious E.g. (Mohamed rasol Allah) And entertainment (music and songs) sono Cairo company Is interested in the field of video production to produce work of dramatic serials (such as gomhoreit zefta, elsharae algeded, elwatad) and other serials.

Singing production
The company seeks to preserve the heritage of songs the good times, where it converted tapes to the electronic media in preparation to launch in the market as digital image CD & DVD & MP3.

Religious production
The company produces the Koran.

Stars who have worked with Sono Cairo

Umm Kulthum
Mohammed Abdel Wahab
Abdul Basit Abdus Samad
Muhammad Metwally Al Shaarawy
Fairuz

External marketing
There are fourteen companies holding the rights to distribute and print production of sout alqahira at the international level, distributed as follows:

The Persian Gulf region and Arab countries

Institution of sout aljazera (Saudi Arabia)
Al-khaleg factory (Saudi Arabia)
Dar alwasela (Saudi Arabia)
Almostakbal company (Kuwait)
Institution of 13- June (Yemen)	
Dan we Dan company (Kuwait)
Music box (Dubai)	
Feras and basem company (Jordan – Palestine)
Institution of Ghazawi (Oman, United Arab Emirates)
Recordings of albeshry (Sharjah, UAE)

The Maghreb region

Vasifun (Morocco)

Africa region

Almasaa international for production and advertising (Sudan)

Europe Region

Platinum

Region of the United States and Canada

Mike's Sound Production (U.S. and Canada)

E-Marketing

To cope with the company has developed e marketing activity to use the modern techniques to market content using the international information network and voice services through mobile and ground and affixed to marketing Internet connections to sono Cairo customers and the e-marketing copying Self-electronic media (CD) & (DVD) & (MP3)

Editing and graphics
A continuation of the bidding company and despite the fire which broke out in units of editing, graphics The Company has created a new center for editing and graphics to keep pace with development in the field of video production and the center houses became include:

No. (5) Units of Nonlinear Editing 
No. (1) Units of linear Editing 
No. (1) Units integrated graphics

Studios
Studio (4) was created in area 200 m on the ground floor In addition to the three studios Company; this is to increase production through the use of visual studio company 
 Abbasid studio (1) 
 Abbasid studio (2) 
 ElGib studio (3) 
 New Abbasid studio (4) 
 El Sayeda Nafeesa studio (5) 
The studios has been developed and networks equipped with the latest lighting and modern digital cameras and generators for electricity.

Factories
The company has two factories to produce and print cassette voice in Alexandria production capacity up to more than 3 million Cassettes per one shift annually with the highest quality in global markets and equipped with the latest modern technology for the production and printing of the Koran bars for famous readers and religious talk, entertainment and musical. In flew the modernization of factories and keep abreast of developments for the printing of the company's production of optical media the development and production units cans (CD) (DVD) production capacity is developed of 10 thousand in one shift per day.

Press
 Printed packaging tapes and CD covers of 4-color offset printing.
 Printed posters, artists and readers of the Quran 4 color.
 Implementation and printed posters advertising (the results of a wall - the results of hierarchical - Results photographer).
 Implementation of trade publications, which include the company's publications and others from books and magazines and so on.
 Processing of paper photography for all sizes of company and others.

Advertising agency
The advertising agency represents one of the major activity in the company which offer integrated advertising services in this regard where it propagate the clients' advertisement in the radio, TV, and Satellite. And it products the ads, and documentaries and implement all forms of advertising required by the ad campaigns.

Sources

Film production companies of Egypt
Mass media companies of Egypt
1964 establishments in Egypt
Mass media companies established in 1964
Government-owned companies of Egypt